Sarah Morton is an American playwright, actor, educator and activist and a native of Cleveland, Ohio.

Selected works
 (2009) "Dream/Home" premiered at the Cleveland Play House, produced by Dobama Theater
 (2006) "Night Bloomers" premiered at the Cleveland Play House, produced by Dobama Theater
 (2004) "4 Minutes to Happy" solo performance, premiered at Cleveland Public Theater, presented at the New York International Fringe Festival
 (2001) "Safety" premiered at Dobama Theater
 (1999) "Thrillsville" premiered at the Cleveland Play House Next Stage Festival
 (1998) "Eight Impressions of a Lunatic" premiered at Dobama Theater
 (1998) "The Eighth Wonder of the World" solo performance, premiered at Dobama Theater
 (1998) "Love In Pieces" premiered at Cleveland Public Theater
 (1996) "Fever Dream: Episode Three" premiered at Dobama Theater

Awards
 Northern Ohio Live Theatre Achievement Award (Nomination); "4 Minutes to Happy" 2005
 Northern Ohio Live Writing Achievement Award (Nomination); "The Eighth Wonder of the World", "Eight Impressions of a Lunatic", 1999
 Cleveland Scene Keefer Award: Best Solo Performance; "The Eighth Wonder of the World", 1998
 Chilcote Award: Cleveland Public Theatre; "Love In Pieces", 1997

References

Living people
21st-century American dramatists and playwrights
Writers from Cleveland
American stage actresses
Year of birth missing (living people)
American activists
Educators from Ohio
American women educators
21st-century American women writers